Paolo Nicolato (born 21 December 1966) is an Italian football manager who coaches the Italy U21 national team.

Managerial career 
A long-time coach with the youth academy of Chievo, Nicolato was appointed the manager of Lumezzane in the Serie C from 2014 to 2016. In 2016 he was appointed the manager of the Italy U18s, and he was subsequently promoted to the U19s, U20s, and then finally the Italy U21s on 3 July 2019.

Managerial statistics

References

External links

Paolo Nicolato coach profile at TuttoCalciatori.net 

1966 births
Living people
Sportspeople from the Province of Vicenza
Italian football managers
F.C. Lumezzane V.G.Z. A.S.D. managers
Serie C managers
Association football coaches